April Christofferson is an American novelist of environmental and political thrillers, including Trapped, Alpha Female and Buffalo Medicine.

Background
Christofferson grew up in Chicago, and frequently spent summers around Yellowstone National Park as a child. She continued this tradition with her own children. Several of her thrillers are set in Yellowstone.

After earning her Bachelor of Science from the University of Utah, Christofferson went on to study veterinary medicine before attending the Gonzaga University School of Law. She received her Juris Doctor from Gonzaga in 1983. Before writing full-time, she also worked as an attorney in the biotechnology industry, an experience that has informed her fiction.

In addition to writing novels, Christofferson has contributed articles to the Yellowstone Discovery, a quarterly published by the Yellowstone Association.

Books
After the Dance (1994)
Edgewater (1998)
The Protocol (1999)
Clinical Trial (2000)
Patent to Kill (2003)
Buffalo Medicine (2004)
Alpha Female (2009)
Trapped (2012)

References

External links

Living people
Year of birth missing (living people)
University of Utah alumni
American women novelists
20th-century American novelists
21st-century American novelists
American thriller writers
21st-century American women writers
20th-century American women writers
Women thriller writers
Gonzaga University alumni
Writers from Chicago